Black Diamond/Cu Nim Airport  is located  northeast of Diamond Valley (formerly Black Diamond), Alberta, Canada.

References

External links
Page about this airport on COPA's Places to Fly airport directory

Registered aerodromes in Alberta
Foothills County